The Hunua Ranges is a mountain range and regional park to the southeast of Auckland city, in the Auckland and Waikato regions of New Zealand's North Island.

Auckland Council owns and manages  of the ranges, including part located in the Waikato region, as a regional park open to the public.

Geography

The ranges are located approximately 50 kilometres (30 mi) southeast of the main Auckland urban area, above the western shore of the Firth of Thames. They are sparsely populated, and mostly lie within the boundaries of the Waharau and Hunua Ranges Regional Parks. The settlement of Hunua lies on the foot of the Hunua Ranges.

The ranges are covered in largest area of native bush in Auckland, with streams, waterfalls, and hills overlooking the Auckland Region and Hauraki Gulf.

Auckland gets much of its water from reservoirs sources from rivers and streams, including the Hunua Falls on the Wairoa River.

The Mangatawhiri Ridge is one of the last remaining breeding grounds of the kokako.

Kohukohunui 

Kohukohunui is the highest point in the Hunua Ranges.

The New Zealand Ministry for Culture and Heritage gives a translation of "great mist" for Kohukohunui.

History

Pre-European settlement

Māori made some use of the ranges and early European visitors found areas of clearing that had been used as gardens. Ngāi Tai are tangata whenua. Some Māori archaeological sites are known. The main part of the ranges was subject to confiscation after the New Zealand Wars.

Early European use of the ranges was for timber extraction and for farming but low soil fertility limited success. There has been some mining of Manganese in the past. Gold prospecting for quartz reefs has never found payable reefs.

20th century

From the 1920s onwards the land was progressively bought by Auckland City Council utilising funds from its water supply operation. Development of the water supplies commenced in 1946, with the first of the four dams, Cossey's, completed with a capacity of 11.3 million cubic meters in 1956. Three embankment dams were constructed in the area: Upper Mangatawhiri (1965), Wairoa (1975) and Mangatangi (1977). Combined, the dams have a capacity of  77.1 million cubic meters, and supply approximately 68% of Auckland's potable water, through the Ardmore Water Treatment Plant.

The bulk water supply operation and the land passed to the newly formed Auckland Regional Authority in 1964. The Authority completed the water supply development and continued the exotic afforestation on some of the north and western catchment land, started by the City Council, and its Water Department administered the land.

The water operation was corporatised as Watercare Services in 1992, but the land itself remained with the Auckland Regional Council (as it was by then). Watercare took ownership of the water related assets and took a long term lease from the Auckland Regional Council of the reservoir areas and the operational areas. The exotic forestry land was also leased to another party. The catchment land became regional park land.

21st century

In November 2010, the southernmost part of the Hunua Ranges were transferred to Waikato region. This determines the local government administrative boundaries, but the ownership of the former Auckland Regional Council park land went to the Auckland Council and that of the water assets is unchanged with Watercare Services.

Extensive flooding in the Hunua Ranges in March 2017 cut off roads. People staying on the ranges had to be evacuated.

In May 2018, parts of the park were closed to stop the spread of Kauri dieback. Some of the tracks reopened in late 2020.

In September and October 2018, the entire park was closed during a 1080 pest control programme. The programme was subject to an unsuccessful legal challenge.

Recreation

Activities in the regional park include walking, mountain-biking, bird-watching and drone-flying.

References

Mountains of the Auckland Region
Mountain ranges of Waikato
Mountain ranges of New Zealand
Parks in the Auckland Region
Regional parks of New Zealand
Franklin Local Board Area
Firth of Thames